Molla Yusef or Molla Yusof, also rendered as Mulla Yusuf, may refer to:
 Molla Yusef, Ardabil
 Molla Yusof, East Azerbaijan